Nilo Floody Buxton (16 July 1921 – 2 July 2013) was a Chilean modern pentathlete. He competed at the 1948, 1952 and 1956 Summer Olympics.

In 1974 he was named Intendant of Bío Bío Region and in 1977 of Magallanes y la Antártica Chilena Region.

References

External links
 

1921 births
2013 deaths
Chilean male modern pentathletes
Olympic modern pentathletes of Chile
Modern pentathletes at the 1948 Summer Olympics
Modern pentathletes at the 1952 Summer Olympics
Modern pentathletes at the 1956 Summer Olympics
Intendants of Biobío Region
Intendants of Magallanes Region
Ambassadors of Chile to Israel
20th-century Chilean people
21st-century Chilean people